Oligoceras is a plant genus of the family Euphorbiaceae, first described as a genus in 1924. It contains only one known species, Oligoceras eberhardtii, endemic to Vietnam.

References

Endemic flora of Vietnam
Monotypic Euphorbiaceae genera
Jatropheae